Wayford Bridge is a village on the River Ant on the A149 road, near Stalham in Norfolk, England within The Broads National Park.

Broads boats can continue to Dilham, though the channel is narrow and has limited places in which to turn around.

External links

Villages in Norfolk
North Norfolk